This is a list of people who have served as Lord-Lieutenant of Shetland. The office was created when that of Lord Lieutenant of Orkney and Shetland was divided in 1948

Sir Arthur Nicolson 8 April 1948 – 25 April 1952
Sir Basil Hamilton Hebden Neven-Spence 21 July 1952 – 1963
Robert Hunter Wingate Bruce 5 July 1963 – 1982
Magnus Macdonald Shearer 6 October 1982 – 1994
John Hamilton Scott 21 April 1994 – 2011
Bobby Hunter 30 November 2011 – present

References

External links
Directory post on Shetland Lieutenancy

Shetland
Shetland
Politics of Shetland